Baseball was contested at the 1926 Central American and Caribbean Games in Mexico City, Mexico.

References
 

1926 Central American and Caribbean Games
1926
1926
Central American and Caribbean Games